Shylock is the principal antagonist of William Shakespeare's play The Merchant of Venice.

Shylock may also refer to:
Shylock (Fauré), incidental music by Gabriel Fauré
Shylock (1940 film), a 1940 Indian Tamil-language film
Shylock (2020 film), an Indian Malayalam-language film
Shylock (play), a monologue by Mark Leiren-Young, premiered 1996
Shylock, a one-man play by Gareth Armstrong, premiered 1998
Shylock (musical), a 1987 musical based on The Merchant of Venice
Shylock, a slang term for a loan shark

See also
The Merchant of Venice (disambiguation)